The 2006 Soul Train Music Awards were held on March 18, 2006 at the Pasadena Conference Center in Pasadena, California and was hosted by Vivica Fox and Tyrese. The show marked the 20th Anniversary of the Soul Train Music Awards.

Special awards

Quincy Jones Award for Outstanding Career Achievements – Female
 Destiny's Child

Quincy Jones Award for Outstanding Career Achievements – Male
 Jamie Foxx

Stevie Wonder Award for Outstanding Achievement in Songwriting
 R. Kelly

Sammy Davis, Jr. Award for "Entertainer of the Year"
 John Legend

Winners and nominees
Winners are in bold text.

Best R&B/Soul Album – Male
 John Legend – Get Lifted
 Anthony Hamilton – Soulife
 R. Kelly – TP.3 Reloaded
 Charlie Wilson – Charlie, Last Name Wilson

Best R&B/Soul Album – Female
 Mariah Carey – The Emancipation of Mimi
 Keyshia Cole – The Way It Is
 Faith Evans – The First Lady
 Fantasia – Free Yourself

Best R&B/Soul Album – Group, Band or Duo
 The Black Eyed Peas – Monkey Business
 112 – Pleasure & Pain
 Earth, Wind & Fire – Illumination
 Mint Condition – Livin' the Luxury Brown

Best R&B/Soul Single – Male
 John Legend – "Ordinary People"
 R. Kelly – "Trapped in the Closet"
 Bobby Valentino – "Slow Down"
 Charlie Wilson – "Charlie, Last Name Wilson"

Best R&B/Soul Single – Female
 Mariah Carey – "We Belong Together"
 Keyshia Cole – "I Should Have Cheated"
 Alicia Keys – "Unbreakable"
 Gwen Stefani – "Hollaback Girl"

Best R&B/Soul Single – Group, Band or Duo
 Destiny's Child – "Cater 2 U"
 Floetry  – "Supastar"
 Pussycat Dolls  – "Don't Cha"
 Nina Sky  – "Turnin' Me On"

The Michael Jackson Award for Best R&B/Soul or Rap Music Video
 Kanye West  – "Gold Digger"
 Common – "Testify"
 Missy Elliott  – "Lose Control"
 R. Kelly – "Trapped in the Closet"

The Coca-Cola Classic Award for Best R&B/Soul or Rap New Artist
 Chris Brown
 Leela James
 Lyfe Jennings
 Bobby Valentino

The Sprite Award for Best R&B/Soul or Rap Dance Cut
 Missy Elliott  – "Lose Control"
 The Black Eyed Peas – "My Humps"
 Gwen Stefani – "Hollaback Girl"
 Kanye West  – "Gold Digger"

Best Gospel Album
 Donnie McClurkin – Psalms, Hymns & Spiritual Songs
 Kurt Carr Project – One Church
 Kirk Franklin – Hero
 CeCe Winans – Purified

Performers
 The Black Eyed Peas
 John Legend
 Chris Brown
 Pussycat Dolls and Avant
 Keyshia Cole
 Charlie Wilson
 Flipsyde

Soul Train Music Awards
Soul
Soul
Soul
Soul